In quantum mechanics, a complete set of commuting observables (CSCO) is a set of commuting operators whose common eigenvectors can be used as a basis to express any quantum state. In the case of operators with discrete spectra, a CSCO is a set of commuting observables whose simultaneous eigenspaces span the Hilbert space, so that the eigenvectors are uniquely specified by the corresponding sets of eigenvalues.

Since each pair of observables in the set commutes, the observables are all compatible so that the measurement of one observable has no effect on the result of measuring another observable in the set. It is therefore not necessary to specify the order in which the different observables are measured. Measurement of the complete set of observables constitutes a complete measurement, in the sense that it projects the quantum state of the system onto a unique and known vector in the basis defined by the set of operators. That is, to prepare the completely specified state, we have to take any state arbitrarily, and then perform a succession of measurements corresponding to all the observables in the set, until it becomes a uniquely specified vector in the Hilbert space (up to a phase).

The compatibility theorem

Then the following statements are equivalent:

 and  have a common eigenbasis.
The operators  and  commute, meaning that .

Proofs

Discussion

If the system happens to be in one of the eigenstates, say, then both  and  can be simultaneously measured to any arbitrary level of precision, and we will get the results  and  respectively. This idea can be extended to more than two observables.

Examples of compatible observables
These components are all compatible.

Formal definition

A set of observables  is called a CSCO if:

All the observables commute in pairs.
If we specify the eigenvalues of all the operators in the CSCO, we identify a unique eigenvector (up to a phase) in the Hilbert space of the system.  

If we are given a CSCO, we can choose a basis for the space of states made of common eigenvectors of the corresponding operators. We can uniquely identify each eigenvector (up to a phase) by the set of eigenvalues it corresponds to.

Discussion

Let us have an operator  of an observable , which has all non-degenerate eigenvalues . As a result, there is one unique eigenstate corresponding to each eigenvalue, allowing us to label these by their respective eigenvalues. Such an observable is itself a self-sufficient CSCO.

In such a case, we need to distinguish between the eigenfunctions corresponding to the same eigenvalue. Now if each pair of the eigenvalues  uniquely specifies a state vector of this basis, we claim to have formed a CSCO: the set .

It may so happen, nonetheless, that the degeneracy is not completely lifted. That is, there exists at least one pair  which does not uniquely identify one eigenvector. If not, we add one more compatible observable and continue the process till a CSCO is obtained.

The same vector space may have distinct complete sets of commuting operators.

Suppose we are given a finite CSCO . Then we can expand any general state in the Hilbert space as

where  are the eigenkets of the operators , and form a basis space. That is,
, etc

For a complete set of commuting operators, we can find a unitary transformation which will simultaneously diagonalize all of them.

Examples

The hydrogen atom without electron or proton spin

Two components of the angular momentum operator  do not commute, but satisfy the commutation relations:

Also, the Hamiltonian  is a function of  only and has rotational invariance, where  is the reduced mass of the system.

The solution of the problem tells us that disregarding spin of the electrons, the set  forms a CSCO. Let  be any basis state in the Hilbert space of the hydrogenic atom. Then

That is, the set of eigenvalues  or more simply,  completely specifies a unique eigenstate of the Hydrogenic atom.

The free particle

For a free particle, the Hamiltonian  is invariant under translations. Translation commutes with the Hamiltonian: . However, if we express the Hamiltonian in the basis of the translation operator, we will find that  has doubly degenerate eigenvalues. It can be shown that to make the CSCO in this case, we need another operator called the parity operator , such that . forms a CSCO.

Again, let  and  be the degenerate eigenstates of corresponding the eigenvalue , i.e.

So,  forms a CSCO.

Addition of angular momenta

Then the basis states of the complete system are  given by

Therefore, for the complete system, the set of eigenvalues  completely specifies a unique basis state, and  forms a CSCO.
Equivalently, there exists another set of basis states for the system, in terms of the total angular momentum operator .

See also
Quantum number
Good quantum number
Degenerate energy levels
Mathematical structure of quantum mechanics
Operators in Quantum Mechanics
Canonical commutation relation
Measurement in quantum mechanics
Collapse of the wavefunction
Angular Momentum (Quantum Mechanics)

References

.

R.P. Feynman, R.B. Leighton and M. Sands: The Feynman Lectures on Physics, Addison-Wesley, 1965
R Shankar, Principles of Quantum Mechanics, Second Edition, Springer (1994).
J J Sakurai, Modern Quantum Mechanics, Revised Edition, Pearson (1994).
B. H. Bransden and C. J. Joachain, Quantum Mechanics, Second Edition, Pearson Education Limited, 2000.
For a discussion on the Compatibility Theorem, Lecture Notes of School of Physics and Astronomy of The University of Edinburgh. http://www2.ph.ed.ac.uk/~ldeldebb/docs/QM/lect2.pdf.
A slide on CSCO in the lecture notes of Prof. S Gupta, Tata Institute of Fundamental Research, Mumbai. http://theory.tifr.res.in/~sgupta/courses/qm2013/hand3.pdf
A section on the Free Particle in the lecture notes of Prof. S Gupta, Tata Institute of Fundamental Research, Mumbai. http://theory.tifr.res.in/~sgupta/courses/qm2013/hand6.pdf

Quantum mechanics